The 1st Central Committee of the Communist Party of Cuba (CPC) was elected at the 1st CPC Congress in 1975.

Apparatus
 Organization Department
 Military Department
 Economic Department
 General Affairs Department
 Department of Science, Education and Culture
 General Department on Foreign Affairs
 Department on Revolutionary Orientation
 Department on Basic Industry
 Agricultural-Livestock Department
 Construction Department
 Communications and Transportation Department
 Department for the Sugar Sector
 Consumer Goods and Domestic Commerce Department
 Department in Charge of the Formation of Cadres
 America Department
 Department for State and Judicial Organs
 Mass Organizations Department
 Party Control and Revision Commission

Members

Alternates

References

1st Central Committee of the Communist Party of Cuba
1975 establishments in Cuba
1980 disestablishments in Cuba